St. Vincent's Health System, based in Birmingham, Alabama, United States is an operator of acute care hospitals located in the Birmingham area and a health ministry of Ascension Health. St. Vincent's Health System is made up of six facilities: St. Vincent's Birmingham, St. Vincent's Blount, St. Vincent's Chilton, St. Vincent's East, St. Vincent's St. Clair, and St. Vincent's One Nineteen. The company employs over 4,700 people throughout its six facilities.

History 

St. Vincent's Hospital (now St. Vincent's Birmingham) was founded in 1898 and is Birmingham's oldest hospital. It was founded by the Daughters of Charity and named after the 17th century Parisian St. Vincent de Paul, who started the Daughters of Charity in 1633. In July 2007, St. Vincent's Hospital merged with Eastern Health System to become St. Vincent's Health System.

Facilities 

 St. Vincent's Birmingham
 St. Vincent's Blount
 St. Vincent's East
 St. Vincent's St. Clair
 St. Vincent's One Nineteen
 St. Vincent's Chilton

References

External links
 www.stvhs.com
 Ascension Health web site

Ascension Health
Companies based in Birmingham, Alabama
Catholic hospitals in North America
Healthcare in Alabama
Hospital networks in the United States
Organizations based in Birmingham, Alabama
Medical and health organizations based in Alabama
1898 establishments in Alabama
Catholic hospital networks in the United States
Catholic health care